Bovine Meat and Milk Factors (BMMFs) are DNA molecules found in beef and cow's milk which have been linked to the development of cancer—particularly colorectal and breast cancer.

Research 
The potential connection between BMMFs and cancer has been made based on assessments of epidemiological data and the investigation of antibodies in human serum. Research has also suggested a potential link between BMMFs and neurodegenerative diseases such as multiple sclerosis.

At the end of 2017, evidence was presented that BMMFs in human cells show long-term survival, through the identification of BMMFs' RNA and protein products. In February 2019, evidence was presented of a previously unknown infectious agent in the blood serum and milk of Eurasian cattle that could indirectly trigger the development of colorectal cancer.

References

Further reading 
 

Beef
Breast cancer
Cancer research
Colorectal cancer
Oncology
Milk